Dominic Cappello is a strategist, writer, designer, and educator. He is the creator of the Ten Talks book series published by Hyperion in 2000 and 2001. Ten Talks received national attention when Oprah Winfrey created a show around the book on sex and character in October 2000, featuring parents who had used the books' approaches to family communication.

Cappello is also the author (with Susan Duron, PhD) of the parent-focused HIV prevention program "Can We Talk?" developed by the National Education Association -Health Information Network through a cooperative agreement with the Centers For Disease Control and Prevention, Division of Adolescent and School Health in 1999.

Cappello, working for the New Mexico Department of Health, developed the youth injury prevention project called the Resiliency Corps. The Resiliency Corps focused on the implementation of evidence-based youth injury, violence and substance misuse prevention strategies. The five year pilot project promoted community mobilizing around policies shown to reduce injuries and offered the course "Youth Safety, Health and Resiliency" at the University of New Mexico-Valencia.

He is the co-founder of Safety and Success Communities, a socially-engaged strategic planning organization in Santa Fe, New Mexico, focused on implementing a data-driven, cross-sector and systemic strategy for the prevention of adverse childhood experiences and trauma. Cappello developed and implemented the Data Scholars Initiative, a management training program focused on data analysis, research and continuous quality improvement for child welfare systems in New York City, Connecticut, New Mexico and Pennsylvania. Cappello co-authored (with Katherine Ortega Courtney, PhD) Anna, Age Eight: The data-driven prevention of childhood trauma and maltreatment, published in 2018 by the non-profit Safety+Success Communities.

Cappello now serves as the co-director of the Anna, Age Eight Institute focused on the data-driven prevention of childhood trauma and social adversity. Cappello and his Anna, Age Eight Institute co-director Katherine Ortega Courtney, PhD are focused on using a data-driven, cross-sector and county-focused strategy throughout New Mexico to prevent and treat adverse childhood experiences (ACEs). Their approach, detailed in their book 100% Community: Ensuring 10 Vital Services for Surviving and Thriving, is informed by research behind the social determinants of health, acknowledging health and education disparities. Their 100% Community initiative mobilizes local change agents, elected officials and stakeholders, working to ensure that all county residents have access to behavioral health care, medical care, stable shelter, secure food and transportation to vital services. Once these services for survival are in place, further mobilizing focuses on securing access to parent supports, early childhood learning programs, community schools, youth mentoring and job training. It has been twenty years since the original Adverse Childhood Experience Study, with little to show for systemwide prevention efforts on a national or statewide level to reduce the impact of ACEs and toxic stress. A critical assessment of the ACEs Study was published that recommends that prevention work focus on the social determinants of health.

Books
100% Community: Ensuring 10 Vital Services for Surviving and Thriving (with Katherine Ortega Courtney, PhD) 
Anna, Age Eight: The data-driven prevention of childhood trauma and maltreatment (with Katherine Ortega Courtney, PhD) 
Ten Talks Parents Must Have With Their Children About Violence 
Ten Talks Parents Must Have With Their Children About Sex And Character (with Pepper Schwartz, PhD) 
Ten Talks Parents Must Have With Their Children About Drugs and Choices (with Xenia Becher, MSW)

References

American male writers
Living people
Year of birth missing (living people)